Bilāl ibn Rabāḥ , was one of the most trusted and loyal Sahabah (companions) of the Islamic prophet Muhammad. He was born in Mecca and is considered to have been the first mu'azzin in history, chosen by Muhammad himself. He was a former Abyssinian slave and was known for his voice with which he called people to their prayers. He died in 640, about the age of 60 (or just over 60 in Hijri years).

Birth and early life
Bilal ibn Rabah was born in Mecca in the Hejaz in the year 580. His father Rabah was an Arab slave for the clan of Banu Jumah while his mother, Hamamah, was allegedly a former princess of Abyssinia who was captured after the event of the Year of the Elephant, and put into slavery.  Being born into slavery, Bilal had no other option but to work for his master, Umayyah ibn Khalaf. Through hard work, Bilal became recognised as a good slave and was entrusted with the keys to the Idols of Arabia. However, racism and sociopolitical statutes of Arabia prevented Bilal from achieving a lofty position in society.

Bilal's appearance

In his book, Bilal ibn Rabah, Muhammad Abdul-Rauf states that Bilal "was of a handsome and impressive stature, dark brown complexion with sparkling eyes, a fine nose and bright skin. He was also gifted with a deep, melodious, resonant voice. He wore a beard which was thin on both cheeks. He was endowed with great wisdom and a sense of dignity and self esteem."
Similarly, in his book The Life of Muhammad, William Muir states that Bilal "was tall, dark, and with African feature and bushy hair." Muir also states that noble members of the Quraysh despised Bilal and called him "Ibn Sawda" (son of the black woman).

Conversion to Islam
When Muhammad announced his prophet-hood and started to preach the message of Islam, Bilal renounced idol worship, becoming one of the earliest converts to the faith.

Persecution of Bilal

When Bilal's slave master, Umayyah ibn Khalaf, found out, he began to torture Bilal. At the instigation of Abu Jahl, Umayyah bound Bilal and had him dragged around Mecca as children mocked him. Bilal refused to renounce Islam, instead repeating "ahad, ahad" ("one, one"), i.e., one God. Incensed at Bilal's refusal, Umayyah ordered that Bilal be whipped and beaten while spread-eagled upon the Arabian sands under the desert sun, his limbs bound to stakes. When Bilal still refused to recant, Umayyah ordered that a hot boulder be placed on Bilal's chest. However, Bilal remained firm in belief and continued to say "ahad, ahad".

Bilal's emancipation 

News of the persecution of Bilal reached some of Muhammad's companions, who informed the prophet. Muhammad sent Abu Bakr to negotiate for the emancipation of Bilal, who manumitted him after either purchasing him or exchanging him for a non-Muslim slave.

Many years later, during the mobilization for one of the Islamic expeditions in the Levant under Abu Bakr's rule, Bilal asked him, being his previous manumitter, for permission to leave Medina and pursue Jihad.

Bilal in Madina 

In the newly formed Islamic state of Madina, Bilal had become a prominent contributing member of the Muslim society taking on important roles.

Adhan
Muhammad chose Bilal as the first mu'azzin (reciter of the Adhan).

Sunni view

The majority of mosques around the world recite the Athan according to the Sunni tradition. A dream was seen by Abdullah ibn Zaid where an angel in the form of a man wearing a green garment taught the words of the adhan. The Prophet then instructed Abdullah to teach those words to Bilal because he had a louder voice than him. Umar ibn al-Khattab also saw the same dream. The detail of this story is mentioned below. 

It is narrated in Sunan Ibn Majah  that Abdullah ibn Zaid said the following:

Shia view

Shias, on the other hand, do not accept Abdullah ibn Ziyad's story. They state that the Adhan was revealed to Muhammad just as the Qur'an al-Majid was revealed to him. Shias believe that the Adhan could not be left to the dreams or reveries. Furthermore, Sayed Ali Asgher Razwy states, "If the Prophet could teach the Muslims how to perform prostrations, and how, when, and what to say in each prayer, he could also teach them how and when to alert others before the time for each prayer." According to the Shia traditions, the angel who taught Muhammad how to perform ablutions preparatory to prayers and how to perform prayers also taught him the Adhan.

Treasury
Bilal rose to prominence in the Islamic community of Medina, as Muhammad appointed him minister of the Bayt al-Mal (treasury). In this capacity, Bilal distributed funds to widows, orphans, wayfarers, and others who could not support themselves.

Military campaigns during Muhammad's era

He participated in the Battle of Badr. Muhammad's forces included Ali ibn Abi Talib, Hamza ibn Abd al-Muttalib,  Ammar ibn Yasir, Abu Dharr al-Ghifari, Abu Bakr, Umar, Mus`ab ibn `Umair, and Az-Zubair bin Al-'Awwam. The Muslims also brought seventy camels and two horses, meaning that they either had to walk or fit three to four men per camel. However, many early Muslim sources indicate that no serious fighting was expected, and the future Caliph Uthman stayed behind to care for his sick wife Ruqayyah, the daughter of Muhammad. Salman the Persian also could not join the battle, as he was still not a free man.

His piety

Bilal was among the sahabah promised Paradise in this world, as mentioned in the story of his footsteps being heard in paradise.

After Muhammad

Sunni view
In the Sīrat Abī Bakr Al-Ṣiddīq that compiled many narrations and compiled historical circumstances regarding the rule of Caliph Abu Bakr, Bilal accompanied the Muslim armies, under the commands of Said ibn Aamir al-Jumahi, to Syria.

Shia view
After Muhammad died in 632 CE, Bilal was one of the people who did not give bay'ah (the oath of allegiance) to Abu Bakr. It is documented that when Bilal did not give bay'ah to Abu Bakr, Umar ibn al-Khattab grabbed Bilal by his clothes and asked, "Is this the reward of Abu Bakr; he emancipated you and you are now refusing to pay allegiance to him?
Bilal replied, "If Abu Bakr had emancipated me for the pleasure of Allah, then let him leave me alone for Allah; and if he had emancipated me for his service, then I am ready to render him the services required. But I am not going to pay allegiance to a person whom the Messenger of God had not appointed as his caliph." Similarly, al-Isti'ab, a Sunni source, states that Bilal told Abu Bakr: "If you have emancipated me for yourself, then make me a captive again; but if you had emancipated me for Allah, then let me go in the way of Allah."
This was said when Bilal wanted to go for Jihad. Abu Bakr then let him go."
The following is a poem by Bilal on his refusal to give Abu Bakr bay'ah:
 By Allah! I did not turn towards Abu Bakr,
 If Allah had not protected me,
 hyena would have stood on my limbs.
 Allah has bestowed on me good
 and honoured me,
 Surely there is vast good with Allah.
 You will not find me following an innovator,
 Because I am not an innovator, as they are.
Being exiled from Medina by Umar and Abu Bakr, Bilal migrated to Syria.

Abu Ja'far al-Tusi, a Shia scholar, has also stated in lkhtiyar al-Rijal that Bilal refused to pay allegiance to Abu Bakr.

Sufism
Purnam Allahabadi, a Sufi poet whose works originated from the Mughal Empire, composed a Qawwali in which he mentioned how time had stopped when some companions blocked Bilal from delivering the Adhan (which he had seen in his dream), and appealed that it was incorrect. Because the companion Bilal was of an Abyssinian origin, he could not pronounce the letter "Sh" (Arabic: Shin ش ). A hadith of Muhammad reports that he said, "The 'seen' of Bilal is 'sheen' in the hearing of Allah," meaning God does not look at the external but appreciates the purity of heart.

Death

The Sunni scholar al-Suyuti in his Tarikh al-khulafa wrote: "He (Bilal) died in Damascus in 17 or 18 AH, but some say 20 AH, or even 21 AH when he was just over sixty years old. Some said he died in Medina, but that is wrong. That is how it is in al-Isabah and other works such as the Tahdhib of an-Nawawi."

When Bilal's wife realized that death was approaching Bilal, she became sorrowful. It is documented that she cried and said, "What a painful affliction!" However, Bilal objected to his wife's opinion by stating, "On the contrary, what a happy occasion! Tomorrow I will meet my beloved Muhammad and his faction (hizb)!"

He is believed to have been buried in the Bab al-Saghir cemetery, Damascus. However, there exists another shrine, believed to be the burial of Bilal, near a small village called al-Rabahiyya, in Amman, Jordan.

Descendants and legacy
The descendants of Bilal ibn Rabah al-Habashi are said to have migrated to the land of Ethiopia in East Africa. The Imperial family of Mali in West Africa also claims descent from him.

Though there are some disagreements concerning the hard facts of Bilal's life and death, his importance on a number of levels is incontestable. Mu'azzins, especially those in Turkey and Africa, have traditionally venerated the original practitioner of their profession. The story of Bilal is the most frequently cited demonstration of Islam's views of measure people not by their nationality nor social status nor race, but measuring people by their Taqwah (piety). 

In 1874, Edward Wilmot Blyden, a former slave of African descent, wrote: "The eloquent Adzan or Call to Prayer, which to this day summons at the same hours millions of the human race to their devotions, was first uttered by a Negro, Bilal by name, whom Mohammed, in obedience to a dream, appointed the first Mu'azzin. And it has been remarked that even Alexander the Great is in Asia an unknown personage by the side of this honoured Negro."

See also
 List of non-Arab Sahabah
 Zayd ibn Harithah
 Keita Dynasty
 List of expeditions of Muhammad
 Bilal: A New Breed of Hero, a 2015 animated film about Bilal's life.

Notes

References

Further reading
 H.M. Ashtiyani. Bilâl d’Afrique, le muezzin du Prophète, Montréal, Abbas Ahmad al-Bostani, la Cité du Savoir, 1999  
 İbn Sa'd. et-Tabakâtü'l-Kübrâ, Beyrut 1960, III, s. 232
 Avnu'l-Ma'bud. Şerh Ebû Dâvud, III,185, İbn Mâce, Ezan, 1, 3
 А. Али-заде. Билал аль-Хабаши // Исламский энциклопедический словарь. – М.: Издательский дом Ансар, 2007. — 400 с.

External links
Medieval Islamic Civilization
Omar H. Ali, "Arabian Peninsula," Schomburg Center, The New York Public Library
al-islam.org – Slaves in the History of Islam
The First Muezzin

Mu'azzins
580 births
630s deaths
640s deaths
Arabian slaves and freedmen
Non-Arab companions of the Prophet
Sahabah who participated in the battle of Badr
Muhajirun
Sahabah hadith narrators